Lavin (also Romanized as Lāvīn) is a village in Lahijan Rural District, in the Central District of Piranshahr County, West Azerbaijan Province, Iran. At the 2006 census, its population was 522, in 65 families.

References 

Populated places in Piranshahr County